Simon Rožman (born 6 April 1983) is a Slovenian professional football manager and former player. He is currently the manager of Slovenian PrvaLiga club Domžale.

Managerial career

Celje
Rožman started his managerial career at Celje, where he was at first part of the Academy coaching structure, and was in charge of the youth selections. During his time in Celje, he was also the Academy Director. In April 2014, he took over the senior team, becoming the youngest manager in the Slovenian PrvaLiga. He led the club to the second place in the league and was the runner-up of the national cup in 2015.

Domžale
In 2016 Rožman joined Domžale, first as a sports coordinator, but soon he was promoted to the first team manager. In his first season, he won the national cup and came fourth in the league. In the next season, he led the club to the third place in the league; he also managed to reach the play-off round of the 2017–18 Europa League, eliminating Bundesliga side SC Freiburg on the way. He left Domžale on 3 September 2019, after failing to win a single game during the first eight rounds of the 2019–20 Slovenian PrvaLiga campaign.

Rijeka
On 23 September 2019, Rožman was appointed as head coach of Prva HNL club Rijeka. With Rijeka, he won the 2019–20 Croatian Cup after beating Lokomotiva 1–0 in the final. During the 2020–21 Europa League qualifying phase, he led Rijeka to respective 2–0 and 1–0 victories over Kolos Kovalivka and Copenhagen, qualifying for the group stage, where the team won four points in a group with Napoli, Real Sociedad and AZ Alkmaar. He resigned on 27 February 2021 after losing 1–0 at home against Hajduk Split.

Maribor
On 20 March 2021, Rožman signed a three-year contract with Slovenian side Maribor, replacing Mauro Camoranesi. He left the club six months later, on 20 September 2021, after a poor start of the 2021–22 season, as Maribor was sitting in sixth place after nine rounds.

Managerial statistics

Honours

Manager
Domžale
Slovenian Cup: 2016–17

Rijeka
Croatian Cup: 2019–20

References

External links
NZS profile 

1983 births
Living people
Sportspeople from Celje
Slovenian footballers
Association football midfielders
NK Celje players
Slovenian PrvaLiga players
Slovenian football managers
NK Celje managers
NK Domžale managers
HNK Rijeka managers
NK Maribor managers
Slovenian expatriate football managers
Slovenian expatriate sportspeople in Croatia
Expatriate football managers in Croatia
Croatian Football League managers